The Association of Top Achiever Scouts (ATAS) is a worldwide Scouting fellowship group, of Scouts and Scouters who have achieved the highest rank as a youth in their Scout associations such as King's Scout, Queen's Scout, President's Scout, Fuji Scout, Eagle Scout, etc.

Developed and formed during the 21st Asia-Pacific  Region Scout Conference in Brunei on 10 December 2004 by Simon Hang-bock Rhee of Korea, Eric Khoo Heng-Pheng of Malaysia, and Alexander Wong of Hong Kong, the association has spread to the other regions of the World Organization of the Scout Movement. Wong serves ATAS as Membership Director.

See also 

List of highest awards in Scouting

References

External links
Ditutup Hari Ini, Jambore Nasional Pramuka 2016 Berhasil Pecahkan 8 Rekor Dunia pojoksatu 21 August 2016
HighBeam Daily News (Colombo, Sri Lanka) December 12, 2012
World Organization of the Scout Movement
International Scouting organizations